The Federation of Arab Republics (FAR; ,) was an unsuccessful attempt by Muammar Gaddafi to merge Libya, Egypt and Syria in order to create a unified Arab state. Although approved by a referendum in each country on 1 September 1971, the three countries disagreed on the specific terms of the merger. The federation lasted from 1 January 1972 to 19 November 1977.

History
In 1969, Arab nationalist military officers seized power in Libya. The ideological influence of Egyptian President Gamal Abdel Nasser over the new Libyan government was immediately apparent. The administration was immediately recognized by the Arab nationalist governments in Egypt, Iraq, Sudan and Syria with Egypt sending experts to aid Libya's inexperienced government. Gaddafi propounded Pan-Arab ideas, proclaiming the need for a single Arab state stretching across North Africa and the Middle East. In December 1969, Libya founded the Arab Revolutionary Front with Egypt and Sudan as a step towards political unification, and in 1970 Syria stated its intention to join.

After Nasser's death in September 1970, his successor, Anwar Sadat, suggested that rather than a unified state, they create a political federation. It was implemented in April 1971 which enabled Egypt, Syria and Sudan to get large grants of Libyan oil money. In February 1972, Gaddafi and Sadat signed an unofficial charter of merger, but it was never implemented as relations broke down the following year. Sadat became increasingly wary of Libya's radical direction, and the September 1973 deadline for implementing the Federation passed by with no action taken. In October 1973 Egypt and Syria, without consulting Libya, launched a co-ordinated attack on Israel, initiating the October war. Sadat agreed to open negotiations with Israel, seeking the return of the Sinai Peninsula to Egypt in exchange for a guarantee to not engage in further attacks on the country. Gaddafi was angered by the war's limited objectives and the ceasefire, and accused Sadat of cowardice, undermining the FAR, and betraying the Arab cause. Sadat responded by revealing he had intervened earlier that year to prevent Libya from sinking a civilian passenger ship carrying Jewish tourists in the Mediterranean Sea. Thereafter Egyptian–Libyan relations were marked by frequent accusations against each country's leaders, and further discussions regarding the pursuit of unity were abandoned.

Referendums
Three simultaneous referendums on the Federation of Arab Republics were held on 1 September 1971, in Egypt, Libya and Syria. In the Egyptian referendum the proposal was approved by 99.96% of voters, in the Libyan referendum it was approved by 98.6% of voters, whilst in Syria 96.4% voted in favour.

Other Federations of Arab Republics

Federation between Egypt, Libya and Sudan (1969/70–1971)
Federation between Egypt, Libya and Syria (1971/72–1974/77)
Union between Egypt and Libya within the Federation (1972–1973/74)
Union between Egypt and Syria within the Federation (1976–1977)
Federation between Egypt, Sudan and Syria (1977)

Symbols of member states

Flags

Coats of arms

Maps

See also
Union of Arab Republics, Iraqi counter-proposal to the Federation of Arab Republics
Arab Federation, a confederation between Iraq and Jordan (1958)
Arab Islamic Republic, a proposed union of Libya and Tunisia (1972)
United Arab Emirates, a union of seven Arab states (1971–present day)
United Arab Republic, a union between Egypt and Syria (1958–61)
United Arab States, a confederation between the United Arab Republic and the Kingdom of Yemen (1958–61)
Unified Political Command, merger projects between Egypt and Iraq as well as between Egypt and North Yemen

References

Citations

Sources

 

 
1970s in Egypt
1970s in Libya
1970s in Syria
Arab League
Arab nationalism in Egypt
Arab nationalism in Libya
Arab nationalism in Sudan
Arab nationalism in Syria
Arab republics
Egypt–Libya relations
Egypt–Syria relations
Former Arab states
Former confederations
Libya–Syria relations
Libya–Sudan relations
Pan-Arabism
States and territories disestablished in 1977
States and territories established in 1972
1972 establishments in Asia
1972 establishments in Africa
1972 establishments in Egypt
1972 establishments in Libya
1972 establishments in Syria
1977 disestablishments in Africa
1977 disestablishments in Asia
1977 disestablishments in Egypt
1977 disestablishments in Libya
1977 disestablishments in Syria